Unnikrishnante Aadyathe Christmas is a 1988 Indian Malayalam film,  directed by Kamal, produced by Kitho, and scripted by John Paul and Kaloor Dennis. The film stars Jayaram, Suresh Gopi, Sumalatha and Innocent in the lead roles. The film has musical score by Johnson.  The film is based on a short story by Kakkanadan.

Plot
Sophia has not been home since a rift with her parents over her marriage to Josekutty. Sophia's father Ittichan and ailing mother request Unnikrishan, a close friend, to find Sophia and bring her home to them.  Unnikrishnan promises the parents that he will bring Sophia home by Christmas. With the help of his old schoolmate, Parasuraman, Unnikrishnan finds Sophia.  Sophia, who is working in a hotel owned by Paul Kallookkaran, claims not to know  Unnikrishnan, who is also met with hostility by Paul. Unnikrishan persists, and learns that Josekutty is dead and Sophia is trapped in a dire situation. She is pretending not to know Unnikrishnan in order to protect him and herself.  Unnikrishan tries to help Sophia escape, but tragedy ensues.

Cast
Jayaram as Unnikrishnan
Sumalatha as Sophia
Suresh Gopi as Parasuraman
Sukumaran as Paul Kallookkaran
Lizy as Sridevi
Nedumudi Venu as Ittichan
Kaviyoor Ponnamma as Aliyamma
Mala Aravindan as Swamy
Thodupuzha Vasanthi as Sophia
Innocent as Josekutty
Devan as Josekutty
Valsala Menon as Parvathiyamma
Lalitha Sree as Subhadra
Lalu Alex as Dasan

Soundtrack
The music was composed by Johnson and the lyrics were written by Sreekumaran Thampi.

References

External links
 

1988 films
1980s Malayalam-language films
Films based on short fiction
Films directed by Kamal (director)
Indian Christmas films
Christianity in India
Films about Christianity
Films scored by Johnson
1980s Christmas films